Danielle Bradbery is the debut studio album of the American country music singer and The Voice season 4-winner of the same name, released on November 25, 2013.

Background and recording
In March 2013, 16-year-old Danielle Bradbery auditioned for season four of the American singing competition The Voice, performing Taylor Swift's "Mean". Adam Levine, Blake Shelton, and Usher all turned around, and Bradbery opted to join 'Team Blake'.  Throughout the competition, Bradbery was the first to send a single to the top 10 on iTunes, had the most singles (five) reach that peak, and had the most iTunes downloads of any contestant in the history of the competition. On June 18, 2013, Bradbery was crowned the winner of The Voice, and the next day signed to Big Machine Records.

Promotion
On September 14, 2013, Bradbery performed on the WGTY Great Country Radio stage at the York Fair, where she sang her first single "The Heart of Dixie" as well as four other new songs from the album.

The first single from the album, "The Heart of Dixie", was sent to country radio on July 8, 2013, and was released to digital retailers (via Universal Republic Nashville) July 16, 2013.  It was officially solicited to radio on July 22. So far, the song has peaked within the top 20 on the Hot Country chart and the top 30  on the Country Airplay chart. "I Will Never Forget You" was also released as a digital download prior to the album's release. It has charted at number 49 on the Country Digital Songs chart.

The second official single released to radio is "Young in America". Bradbery announced this through her Facebook page on March 28, 2014.

Bradbery revealed details about her upcoming album on October 1 through a live Facebook chat, including the album's title, cover image, and release date. On October 22, Bradbery released the official track list hour by hour via Twitter.

Critical reception

The album received positive reviews from critics.

Track listings
All tracks produced by Dann Huff except "The Heart of Dixie", produced by Brett James.

Personnel
 Tim Akers - piano
 Bruce Bouton - steel guitar 
 Mike Brignardello - bass
 Tom Bukovac - electric guitar, acoustic guitar, banjo
 J. T. Corenflos - electric guitar 
 Chad Cromwell - drums
 Eric Darken - percussion
 Dan Dugmore - steel guitar
 Stuart Duncan - fiddle 
 Sam Ellis - backing vocals
 Larry Franklin - mandolin, fiddle
 Paul Franklin - steel guitar
 Tony Harrell - piano
 Dann Huff - electric guitar, 12-string guitar
 Charlie Judge - keyboards, synthesizer 
 Tony Lucido - bass
 Jerry McPherson - electric guitar
 Greg Morrow - drums 
 Cherie Oakley - backing vocals
 Ethan Pilzer - bass
 Danny Rader - acoustic guitar, mandolin, banjo
 Mike Rojas - piano, accordion 
 Jimmie Lee Sloas - bass
 Aaron Sterling - drums
 Ilya Toshinsky - acoustic guitar, mandolin, banjo

Chart performance
Danielle Bradbery's self-titled debut album debuted at No. 5 on the US top country albums chart with first week sales of 41,000 copies. As of June 2014 the album has sold 139,000 copies in the U.S.

Weekly charts

Year-end charts

Singles

References

2013 debut albums
Danielle Bradbery albums
Big Machine Records albums
Albums produced by Dann Huff